Scott Tronc (born 15 May 1965) is an Australian former rugby league footballer who played in the 1980s and 1990s. A Queensland State of Origin representative forward, he played club football in Brisbane with Souths, winning a premiership with them in 1985, and later the Broncos, and in Sydney with Wests, Canterbury-Bankstown and Souths.

Playing career
Tronc was the winner of the Rothmans Medal (joint with Bryan Neibling) in 1986 while playing for Brisbane Souths.

Tronc played 34 games for Western Suburbs from 1987 to 1988 as a prop forward, before joining Brisbane to play 21 games from 1989 to 1990. He represented the Queensland State of Origin team in one match as a reserve in 1988. In 1991, he joined Canterbury to become a regular member of the first-grade team, playing mostly in the second row. That year, he played in one finals match against Western Suburbs as a replacement.

In 1992, Tronc started the season in the first-grade side but was relegated, with his place going to Gavin Hill. He subsequently became a regular member of the reserve-grade team but was still often used as a first-grade replacement.

In 1993, he coached the Under 21 team but returned to playing when he joined South Sydney in 1994 to play seven games that season, his last in the league.

Coaching
Tronc spent periods as assistant coach at Redcliffe Dolphins and the Brisbane Broncos NYC team.

References

External links
Scott Tronc at bulldogs.com.au
Queensland representatives at qrl.com.au
 

1965 births
Living people
Australian rugby league players
Brisbane Broncos players
Souths Logan Magpies players
Canterbury-Bankstown Bulldogs players
South Sydney Rabbitohs players
Queensland Rugby League State of Origin players
Rugby league players from Queensland
Rugby league second-rows
Rugby league props
Western Suburbs Magpies players